Aleksia Karutasu (born 10 June 2003) is a Turkish professional volleyball player who currently plays for VakıfBank Istanbul and the Turkey national team.

Career
She competed at the 2019 FIVB Volleyball Girls' U18 World Championship, where Romania ranked sixth. She also competed at the 2018 Girls' U17 Volleyball European Championship, where the Romanian team placed fifth.

Karutasu is the youngest debutant (13 Years, 4 Months) in the Divizia A1 history. She made her Romanian top-flight debut with CSM București in October 2016, coming on as a substitute against CSM Volei Alba Blaj.

Galatasaray
On 14 May 2021 she signed a contract with Galatasaray.

Achievements
Divizia A1:
Winner: 2018
Cupa României:
Winner: 2018
CEV Challenge Cup:
Winner: 2021
European Youth Olympic Festival:
Silver Medalist: 2019

Individual awards
 Romanian Volleyball Player of the Year: 2021
 CEV Challenge Cup Top Scorer (128 points): 2021

Personal life
Căruțașu's parents Andreea and Virgil Căruțașu were both basketball players. She speaks fluent Turkish and recently got Turkish citizenship.

References

External links
CEV profile
The Next Big Thing in Volleyball: Aleksia Karutasu

2003 births
Living people
Volleyball players from Bucharest
Turkish women's volleyball players
Opposite hitters
VakıfBank S.K. volleyballers
Yeşilyurt volleyballers
Galatasaray S.K. (women's volleyball) players
Expatriate volleyball players in Turkey
Romanian expatriate sportspeople in Turkey